Foon Yew High School is the largest Chinese independent high school in Malaysia. The school has three campuses: first in Stulang Laut, second in Kulai, and recent third in Masai. Foon Yew High School has two semesters each year. An academic year begins in January and finishes at the end of November, with a near two-week holiday in June.

Introduction
Foon Yew High School is the largest Chinese independent high school in Malaysia in terms of both students and campus size. The main school, with its  campus, is located in Stulang Laut, Johor Bahru, the school's Kulai branch, with its  campus, is located in Taman Indahpura, Kulai, and another branch in Masai, with its  campus, is located in Bandar Seri Alam, Masai. 

The school enrolls the most students among the Chinese independent high schools in Malaysia. In Jan 2007, there were 5326  registered students in the main campus and 2684  registered students in its Kulai campus.

Foon Yew High School is named after a quote in the Doctrine of the Mean: "宽柔以教，不报无道，南方之强也，君子居之。" (English translation: "To be broadminded and gentle in teaching and not rashly punish wrong-doing is the strength of the South. The Superior Man abides in this.")

A Confucius statue stands at the centre of the main school campus. A quote by Confucius can be found below the statue: 学而不思则罔，思而不学则殆。(English translation: "To learn without thinking is blindness, to think without learning is idleness.")

History
On 18 May 1913, Foon Yew Chinese Primary School was founded by Huang Xichu, Luo Yusheng, Zheng Yaji and Chen Yingxiang. During World War II, the school suffered heavy damage and was forced to close down. After World War II, the school was re-constructed by Shi Liandui. In 1951, the school decided to extend the Chinese education and established Foon Yew High School. In 1963, the number of students reached 1500. In 1980, the school implemented an entrance examination for new students. There were over 4000 students in the school at the time. In 2005, the school's branch, Foon Yew-Kulai High School, in Kulai, Johor was officially opened. In 2015, Foon Yew High School-Kulai celebrated the school's 10th anniversary. The current students in both high schools had reached 12000. In 2021, the school's second branch in Bandar Seri Alam, Masai was officially opened.

Notable alumni

 Penny Tai - a popular singer and songwriter in the Mandopop music arena
 Chew Sin Huey - a singer, the first runner-up in the female category of Project SuperStar 2005
 Dr. Boo Cheng Hau - a Johor state assemblyman of the political party DAP. Won in the Skudai zone of the 12th Malaysia General Election over fellow Foon Yew Alumni
 Dato' (Dr) Siow Kuang Ling - an inventor and medical surgeon. His inventions have won more than 20 awards from National and International Innovation competitions.
 Quek See Ling - a poet, writer, Chinese ink painter and editor.

See also
 Education in Malaysia

References

 "Johor Bahru Foon Yew High School 2007 new academic year ceremony", 3 January 2007. Accessed 26 April 2007.
 "2007 Foon Yew-Kulai High School new enrolled students". Accessed 26 April 2007.
 "Chinese version of the Doctrine of the Mean", Wikisource. Accessed 26 April 2007.
 Muller, Charles. "The Doctrine of the Mean", 23 March 2005. Accessed 26 April 2007.(Lim Seng Koon)

External links

 Foon Yew High School

Schools in Johor
1913 establishments in British Malaya
Educational institutions established in 1913
Chinese-language schools in Malaysia
Secondary schools in Malaysia